Sacerdotalism (from Latin sacerdos, "priest", literally "one who presents sacred offerings", sacer, "sacred", and dare, "to give") is the belief in some Christian churches that priests are meant to be mediators between God and humankind. The understanding of this mediation has undergone development over time and especially with the advent of modern historical and biblical studies.

Christian theology of Sacerdotalism
 
Sacerdotalism is found in Roman Catholic, Eastern Orthodox, and some forms of Anglo-Catholic theology.

The current understanding of the role of the priest in the Roman Catholic Church depends vitally on the understanding of the sacrifice of Christ which is remembered in the Catholic Mass. A current explanation of Christ's sacrifice by Edward J. Kilmartin, S.J., a theologian at the Pontifical Gregorian University, is as follows:

Disagreement with Sacerdotalism

Unlike the above Christian theologies, the Protestant tradition generally rejects sacerdotalism based on how the Protestant tradition has understood verses such as 1 Timothy 2:5. Those churches argue that the New Testament presents only one atoning sacrifice, the Body of Christ offered once for all on the cross by Christ himself, who is both the sinless offering and the sinless priest. The Eucharistic sacrifices of prayer, praise, and thanksgiving are offered by all believers as spiritual priests. The Body of Christ – in what is often called the Eucharist, Holy Communion, Holy Supper, or Lord's Supper – is not offered by the ministry to God as a means of sheltering the communicants from the divine wrath, but it is offered by God through the ministry as representatives of the congregation, to individuals, as an assurance of his gracious will to forgive them their sins.

According to Lutherans, the office of the ministry in Christianity is not part of the priestly system of the Old Testament, rather it is an institution found in the Gospels. For some Lutherans this ministry is not a self-perpetuating group that can be passed on to successors through ordination. Instead, those Lutherans hold that the divinely instituted ministry continues the work of Christ by exercising on behalf of the laity the means of grace, which Christ gave to all Christian believers. Other Lutherans emphasize the view that the office of the ministry is a continuation of the priestly work of the Apostles handed down in a succession of ordinations, whether through bishops or presbyters.

See also

Anti-clericalism
Clericalism
Universal priesthood

References

Sources
Augsburg Confession, Article XXIII: Of the Marriage of Priests.
The Apology of the Augsburg Confession, Article XXIV Of the Mass.
Sckmalkald Articles, Article II: Of the Mass.

Catholic theology and doctrine
Lutheran theology
Christian terminology